SABIO-RK (System for the Analysis of Biochemical Pathways - Reaction Kinetics) is a web-accessible database storing information about biochemical reactions and their kinetic properties.

SABIO-RK comprises a reaction-oriented representation of quantitative information on reaction dynamics based on a given selected publication.
This comprises all available kinetic parameters together with their corresponding rate equations,
as well as kinetic law and parameter types and experimental and environmental conditions under which the kinetic data were determined.
Additionally, SABIO-RK contains information about the underlying biochemical reactions and pathways including their reaction participants,
cellular location and detailed information about the enzymes catalysing the reactions.

SABIO-RK Database Content 
The data stored in SABIO-RK in a comprehensive manner is mainly extracted manually from literature. This includes reactions, their participants (substrates, products), modifiers (inhibitors, activators, cofactors), catalyst details (e.g. EC enzyme classification, protein complex composition, wild type / mutant information), kinetic parameters together with corresponding rate equation, biological sources (organism, tissue, cellular location), environmental conditions (pH, temperature, buffer) and reference details. Data are adapted, normalized and annotated to controlled vocabularies, ontologies and external data sources including KEGG, UniProt, ChEBI, PubChem, NCBI, Reactome, BRENDA, MetaCyc, BioModels, and PubMed.
As of October 2021 SABIO-RK contains about 71.000 curated single entries extracted from more than 7.300 publications.

Several tools, databases and workflows in Systems Biology make use of SABIO-RK biochemical reaction data by integration into their framework including
SYCAMORE,
MeMo-RK,
CellDesigner,
PeroxisomeDB,
Taverna workflows
or tools like KineticsWizard software for data capture and analysis.
Additionally, SABIO-RK is part of MIRIAM registry, a set of guidelines for the annotation and curation of computational models

SABIO-RK Database Access 
The usage of SABIO-RK is free of charge. Commercial users need a license.
SABIO-RK offers several ways for data access:
 a browser-based interface
 RESTful-based web services for programmatic access

Result data sets can be exported in different formats including SBML, BioPAX/SBPAX, and table format.

References

External References 
SABIO-RK homepage

Systems biology
Biochemistry
Molecular biology
Proteins
Biological databases